SOTA Toys, or State Of The Art Toys, is a developer, manufacturer, and wholesaler of collectibles based on licensed properties from companies such as Capcom and Universal.  Formed in 2000 by Jerry Macaluso, they have created and manufactured numerous licensed products based on the characters from popular films, TV shows, hit video games, and literary works, as well as legendary musicians and pop stars. Aside from being a developer and manufacturer, SOTA Toys also serves as fabricator and prototyper for the motion picture, toys/collectibles, and video game industry.

Current product lines

Ōkamiden
In accordance with Capcom's upcoming Ōkamiden, limited-edition plushies and pillows are being made of Chibiterasu, the son of the wolf goddess Amaterasu from the previous game.

Darksiders
SOTA Toys has announced a partnership with THQ that will result in a series of high-end collectible art statues based on THQ's critically and commercially successful video game title, Darksiders. The first model to be released from this partnership will be a 14-inch statue of WAR, the lead character of the game and the first Four Horsemen of the Apocalypse, atop his fiery mount, Ruin. The statue is currently still in the prototyping phase. Despite the obvious similarity to the earlier Death statue, War is part of a separate line, as it is property of THQ, whereas Death is a SOTA original.

Humping Robot keychain figure
The company is releasing a 5-inch tall keychain figure of the Humping Robot character from the stop motion television show Robot Chicken. These figures feature articulation in the neck, arms, hands, legs and even hips!

Ryu – Anniversary Edition Statue
For SOTA's 10th Anniversary they produced an 18-inch statue of Ryu from Super Street Fighter 4. This statue is a culmination of 10 years of experience and will be guaranteed to impress. Exceptionally bright LEDs illuminate Ryu in an awe-inspiring power-up pose, and are powered by USB cable which can connect to any powered 5v USB port or into an included US wall-socket adapter. The standard version is limited to 200 pieces, while the Satsui no Hadou variant is limited to 100 pieces.

Street Fighter resin statues
SOTA Toys' current flagship product is a line of 1/6 scale statues depicting characters from Capcom's popular fighting game series: Street Fighter. These high-quality resin figures are non-poseable, but feature much more detail and superior paint than any previous works. Having already produced Ryu, Blanka, Sagat, Ken, Akuma and Cammy, SOTA is continuing this line with Juri, a new character from Super Street Fighter 4, and has plans to produce other popular characters from previous games.

SOTA Nightmares
Returning to their horror background, SOTA has released several exceptionally detailed resin statues of H.P. Lovecraft's creatures, Cthulhu and Nyarlathotep, with Dagon ready for release mid-2010. Nightmares is not limited to Lovecraft's imaginings, however. SOTA is also releasing a series of statues based on the Four Horsemen of the Apocalypse from the Book of Revelation. They will be made of the same resin material as the other aforementioned products. The first horseman, Death, has been released in early 2010. Although they have a similar namesake, SOTA Nightmares is not intended to be a continuation of the previous Nightmares of Lovecraft line.

Past products

Street Fighter 15th Anniversary action figures 
SOTA's Street Fighter line was unique in that the line-ups for each round were voted on by fans. SOTA had set up the voting so that popular characters are evenly distributed between the rounds of action figures. By delaying the release of the most popular characters, SOTA had produced more figures over a longer period of time, allowing obscure characters that would never sell on their own to be produced.

List of characters produced for the line:
 Round 1: Ryu, Chun Li, Bison, Sagat, Sodom, Evil Ryu
 Round 2: Ken, T. Hawk, Cammy, Blanka, Vega
 Round 3: Guile, Adon, Gen, Balrog, Sakura
 Round 4: Remy, Birdie, Akuma, Fei Long, Ibuki
 Exclusive: Gouken

Street Fighter Revolution Action Figures
In late 2007, SOTA released a new line of action figures known as Street Fighter Revolution.  This line differs from the previous one in that the joints are character-specific, the sculpts differently styled, and the packaging is a highly detailed box rather than a blister pack. Round 1 features E. Honda, Zangief, Dhalsim, and Rainbow Mika.

Preceding the Revolution line was Street Fighter Preview, a sort of teaser line for the then-upcoming Revolution line. Featuring Ryu, Ken, Akuma, and Dan Hibiki, differently-colored variants were available, in limited quantity.

Street Fighter Rotocast Figures
SOTA produced a line of 10-inch pvc figures featuring details on par with their resin statue lineup. Rotocast figures feature actual fabric for the characters' clothing. Ryu and Sagat were produced for Round 1, both with variants. However the lineup was cancelled after the success of the resin figures.

Darkstalkers mini-busts 2007 San Diego Comic-Con. 
The characters Dee and Demetri from Capcom's fighting game Darkstalkers were produced as mini-busts for the 2007 San Diego Comic-Con. SOTA Toys also produced a 1/10 scale statue of Felicia in 2007.  Earlier plans for Demetri and Lord Raptor action figures had been canceled due to low pre-order sales.

Now Playing Presents
Earlier on, SOTA produced a line called "Now Playing Presents" depicting characters and creatures from various horror films. Among them were Pumpkinhead, An American Werewolf in London, Darkman, Dune, Dog Soldiers, The Thing, Legend, The Toxic Avenger, Killer Klowns from Outer Space,  Jeepers Creepers 2, The Mummy Returns and Land of the Dead.

Nightmares of Lovecraft
Not to be confused with the current SOTA Nightmares line, figures in the Nightmares of Lovecraft line were smaller-scaled action figures with moveable parts. Featured were Cthulhu (The Call of Cthulhu), Dagon (The Shadow Over Innsmouth), and The Ghoul (Pickman's Model). Although the packaging for these products included the Now Playing Presents logo, Nightmares of Lovecraft were intended to be a separate line.

Music
Country music star Johnny Cash, punk band Fall Out Boy, rapper Snoop Dogg and horrorcore duos Insane Clown Posse and Twiztid have also been depicted as collectible figures. Talking plush dolls depicting members of the popular punk band Fall Out Boy became available in early 2009. During the recording of their fifth album, Folie à Deux, each band member made special recordings for the production of these plush dolls.

Miscellaneous works
Other film/television projects previously produced include: Tomb Raider, The Chronicles of Riddick, Charmed, Transformers, and Aliens.

Promotional Work

Tatsunoko vs Capcom: Ultimate All-Stars
Late in 2009 SOTA embarked upon a quest to produce 4 prototype action figures that would star in a TV spot for Tatsunoko vs Capcom. In short time, SOTA produced Ryu, MegaMan Volnutt, Ken the Eagle, and Tekkaman Blade to be highly detailed, poseable, and colorful. The result was a success.

Lost Planet 2
SOTA produced various-sized plush dolls of the Gordiant, the giant salamander boss at the end of Episode 1 of Capcom's game Lost Planet 2. Although never actually sold by SOTA, the plushes were given away by Capcom at the 2009 San Diego Comic-Con and through an online contest. Additionally, SOTA mass-produced a small, plastic Gordiant figure as an exclusive for box sets of the European version of the game.

Dark Void
In mid-2009, a 12" resin sculpt of the main character from Capcom's upcoming game Dark Void was produced exclusively for promotional sales. Set in the iconic position seen in the game, the figure's jetpack flame and visor are illuminated with LEDs. A 3-inch tall miniature version of this figure was mass-produced, along with life-sized props that were worn by a model dressed as the character for E3 2009.

See also
 Funko

References

External links
 Official website (archived)
 Official image directory

Companies based in California
Toy companies established in 2000
Toy companies of the United States